Banner is an unincorporated community in northern Iron County, in the U.S. state of Missouri.

History
A post office called Banner was established in 1924 and remained in operation until 1956. It is unknown why the name "Banner" was applied to this community. A variant name was "Brule".

References

Unincorporated communities in Iron County, Missouri
Unincorporated communities in Missouri